Madhubani district is one of the thirty-eight districts of Bihar, India, and is a part of Darbhanga division. Its administrative headquarters are located in Madhubani.

History

Madhubani became a district in 1972 when it was split from Darbhanga district. It is believed that Baliraajgadh, an archaeological site which lies in modern-day Madhubani district was the capital of the ancient Mithila Kingdom.

Culture

Madhubani art or Mithila painting was traditionally created by the women of various communities in Mithila region of India and Nepal. It originated from Madhubani district of Mithila region of Bihar, and, it is popularly called Mithila painting or Madhubani art. Madhubani is also a major export centre of these paintings.  This painting as a form of wall art was practiced widely throughout the region; the more recent development of painting on paper and canvas mainly originated among the villages around Madhubani, and it is these latter developments led to the name Madhubani art being used alongside the name "Mithila Painting."

Geography
It occupies the Terai region.

Politics 
  

|}

Economy
In 2006 the Ministry of Panchayati Raj named Madhubani one of the country's 250 most backward districts (out of a total of 640). It is one of the 38 districts in Bihar currently receiving funds from the Backward Regions Grant Fund Programme. But in last few years there a lot of changes happened.
This city is going to adopt urbanisation.

Places
Saurath, a road side village on Madhubani-Jainagar road, contains a temple known as Somnath Mahadev. It owes its importance to the annual Sabha held by Maithili Brahmins for negotiating marriages. Many Panjikars who keep the genealogical records of the different families reside here and outside.

Laukaha is a Town in the district of Madhubani in the Indian state of Bihar. It is close to the border of Nepalese town of Thadi. Laukaha in India and Thadi in Nepal are a part of one of the agreed route for Mutual Trade between India and Nepal. Nepal Government of Nepal has set up a dedicated customs office in the town. and Government of India has set up a Land Customs Station with a Superintendent level officer. So in simple Import and Export are allowed in this location.

Subdivisions 
Madhubani District consists of five subdivisions. Each subdivision is headed by a subdivisional magistrate, who is responsible for law and order, development, and revenue related work in their respective subdivisions.

 Madhubani Sadar
 Benipatti 
 Jhanjarpur 
 Phulparas 
 Jainagar

Blocks and circles 
There are 21 blocks and circles in the district and each block is headed by a block development officer and each circle is headed by a circle officer.

 Rahika
 Pandaul
 Rajnagar
 Babubarhi
 Kaluahi
 Khjauli
 Jainagar
 Ladania
 Basopatti
 Benipatti
 Bisfi
 Harlakhi
 Madhwapur
 Jhanjarpur
 Andhrathadi
 Lakhnaur
 Madhepur
 Phulparas
 Ghoghardiha
 Khutauna
 Laukahi

Demographics

According to the 2011 Indian census, Madhubani district has a population of 4,487,379, This gives it a ranking of 37th in India (out of a total of 640). Its population growth rate from 2001-2011 was 25.51%. Madhubani has a sex ratio of 926 females for every 1000 males, and a literacy rate of 58.62%. 3.60% of the population lives in urban areas. Scheduled Castes and Scheduled Tribes made up 13.08% and 0.09% of the population respectively.

At the time of the 2011 Census of India, 84.07% of the population in the district spoke Maithili, 12.86% Urdu and 2.92% Hindi as their first language.

See also
Alpura, India
Bichkhana
Ghoghardiha

References

External links
 Official website

 
Districts of Bihar
Populated places in Mithila, India
Darbhanga division
1976 establishments in Bihar